Big Iron World is the second studio album by folk/country/old timey band Old Crow Medicine Show, released on August 29, 2006. The album was produced by David Rawlings who is best known for being Gillian Welch's musical partner. Welch herself plays drums on four tracks on the album.

Track listing

Chart performance

Personnel
Ketch Secor - Vocals, harmonica, fiddle, banjo
Willie Watson - Guitar, vocals, banjo
Critter Fuqua - Banjo, vocals, slide guitar
Kevin Hayes - Guitjo, vocals on "Let It Alone"
Morgan Jahnig - Upright bass
David Rawlings - Guitar (tracks 4 & 10)
Gillian Welch - Drums (tracks 5,6,10 & 11)

External links
Old Crow Medicine Show (official site)

2006 albums
Old Crow Medicine Show albums